The Great Vacation Vol.1: Super Best of Glay is a compilation album by Japanese band Glay, released on June 10, 2009. It reached #2 on Billboard Japan Top Albums and Oricon charts and sold 194.289 copies. It was certified Platinum for the shipment of over 250,000 copies.

Track list
Disc 1

 Yuuwaku
 MERMAID
 Missing You
 GLOBAL COMMUNICATION
 STAY TUNED
 Hitohira no Jiyuu
 Way of Difference
 Mata Koko de Aimashou
 Aitai Kimochi
 Itsuka
 BEAUTIFUL DREAMER
 STREET LIFE
 Toki no Shizuku
 Tenshi no Wakemae
 Peak Hateshinaku Soul Kagirinaku

Disc 2

 Blue Jean (Jet the Phantom Mix)
 White Road
 SCREAM (GLAY x EXILE)
 ROCK'N'ROLL SWINDLE
 LAYLA
 ANSWER (GLAY feat. KYOSUKE HIMURO)
 Natsuoto
 Henna Yume ~THOUSAND DREAMS~
 100 Mankai no KISS
 MIRROR
 Kodou
 Bokutachi no Shouhai
 SORRY LOVE
 aka to kuro no MATADORA
 Harumadewa

Disc 3

 Burning Chrome
 ASHES-1969-
 VERB
 laotour ～Furueru Kobushi ga Tsukamu Mono～
 THE BIRTHDAY GIRL
 I LOVE YOU wo sagashiteru
 Itsuka no Natsu ni Mimi wo Sumaseba
 NO ESCAPE
 Synchronicity
 I am xxx
 RUN
 SAY YOUR DREAM
 Rhythm

References 

Glay albums
2009 compilation albums